Hungerford is an outback town in the Shire of Bulloo and a locality in the Shire of Bulloo and Shire of Paroo, South West Queensland, Australia.
The locality of Hungerford on the New South Wales side of the border had a population of 15.

It is  immediately north of the border with New South Wales and the Dingo fence.

Hungerford will be the site of a total solar eclipse on 22 July 2028.

Geography 
The locality is split between the Shire of Bulloo (western part) and the Shire of Paroo (eastern part). The town is located in the Shire of Bulloo immediately north of the border between Queensland and New South Wales.

Surrounding the town is the Currawinya National Park.

Hungerford Aerodrome is operated by the Bulloo Shire Council. It is to the east on the town on the Hungerford Airstrip Road. It has no lighting but portable lights and flairs can be used in emergencies.

History
Hungerford was in Badjiri territory.

The town is named after Thomas Hungerford who once camped at the site. The town developed from a border customs post on a stock route alongside the Paroo River. In 1874, the first hotel opened and the following year the town was gazetted. For a number of years, before a proper survey was conducted the town was thought to be located in New South Wales.

Hungerford Post Office opened on 1 October 1880, was replaced by a New South Wales office in 1881, reopened in 1886 and closed by 1907, replaced the New South Wales office in 1941 and closed by 1985.

In 1892-3, Henry Lawson visited the town and wrote a short story named after it.  In the story he wrote:  The town is right on the Queensland border, and an inter-provincial rabbit-proof fence -- with rabbits on both sides of it -- runs across the main street. ...Hungerford consists of two houses and a humpy in New South Wales, and five houses in Queensland. Characteristically enough, both the pubs are in Queensland.  We got a glass of sour yeast at one and paid six pence for it -- we had asked for English ale. 

A Cobb & Co coach service to the town was stopped in 1904.

Hungerford Provisional School opened in 1892, becoming Hungerford State School in 1909. It closed in 1918, due to low attendance. It reopened in 1928, but low attendances caused it to close again in 1930. The school was on a  site bounded by Arcturus Street, Achernar Street, Aldebran Street and Canopus Street. The school was reopened one final time in the Bulloo Shire Hall between 30 January and 11 December 1981.

In 1919 during the Spanish flu pandemic, Queensland Police were dispatched from Charleville to Hungerford to close the border at Hungerford, to prevent people crossing into Queensland from New South Wales to reduce the spread of the flu.

The locality of Hungerford on the New South Wales side of the border had a population of 15.

During 2020 and 2021 in response to the COVID-19 pandemic, Queensland Police again closed the border at Achenar Street at Hungerford to prevent movement of people between the two states.

Heritage listings 
Hungerford has a number of heritage-listed sites, including:
 Royal Mail Hotel, Archernar Street

Economy 
There are a number of homesteads in the locality:

 Boorara
 Corina
 Currawinya
 Granite Springs
 Karto
 Moombidary
 Werewilka

Attractions 
Walters Range Lookout is off the Old Thargominda Hungerford Road.

References

External links

 

Towns in Queensland
Localities in Queensland
Shire of Bulloo
Shire of Paroo